Flores (from Portuguese 'flowers') is an Indonesian island in the Lesser Sunda archipelago.

Flores may also refer to:

People
Flores (surname)

Places
Flores, Buenos Aires, Argentina, a neighborhood
Flores, Pernambuco, Brazil
Flores Island (British Columbia), Canada
Flores Canton, Costa Rica
Flores, El Petén, Guatemala, a departmental capital
Flores Costa Cuca, Guatemala
Flores Sea, Indonesia
Flores, Los Santos, Panama
Flores Island (Azores), Portugal
Flores Department, Uruguay
Isla de Flores, Uruguayan island

Other uses
Flores (company), a company in Serbia
Flores (TransMilenio), a bus station in Bogotá, Colombia
"Flores" (song), a song by Brazilian band Titãs
"Flores" (Sophia song), a song by Brazilian artist Sophia
Reno v. Flores, a 1993 Supreme Court of the US case also known as the Flores Settlement